The following is a list of recorded songs by the American rock band Farewell, My Love.

Farewell, My Love